Pararealgar is an arsenic sulfide mineral with the chemical formula , also represented as AsS. It forms gradually from realgar under exposure to light. Its name derives from the fact that its elemental composition is identical to realgar, . It is soft with a Mohs hardness of 1 - 1.5, is yellow orange in colour, and its monoclinic prismatic crystals are very brittle, easily crumbling to powder.

It forms upon exposure of the symmetrical isomer to light. Its name derives from the fact that its elemental composition is identical to realgar, .

Structure

In pararealgar, there are three kinds of As centres (and three kinds of S centres). The molecule has Cs symmetry. In realgar, the four As (and four S) centres are equivalent and the molecule has D2d symmetry. An analogous pair of isomers is also recognized for the corresponding phosphorus sulfides .

Occurrence
Pararealgar occurs as an alteration product of realgar in stibnite-bearing quartz veins typically as a result of exposure to light. It occurs associated with realgar, stibnite, tetrahedrite, arsenopyrite, duranusite, native arsenic, arsenolite, native sulfur, lepidocrocite and pyrite.

It was first described in 1980 for an occurrence in the Grey Rock Mine, Truax Creek, Bridge River area, Lillooet Mining Division, British Columbia, Canada. It has since been reported from a variety of locations worldwide.

Formation
Pararealgar is an alteration product of realgar resulting from exposure to light. The process of alteration is dependent on the wavelength of light, with alteration only occurring at wavelengths longer than approximately 500 nm, in the visible light spectrum.

In realgar's crystal structure, each arsenic atom is bonded to two sulphur atoms and one other arsenic atom. The As-As bonds are 30% weaker than the As-S bonds and certain wavelengths of lights interact with the crystal structure of realgar, breaking the weaker bonds between arsenic atoms. The free As formed as a result of this process destabilises the realgar structure, causing the realgar to become powdery pararealgar without changing overall chemical composition.

References

Arsenic minerals
Sulfide minerals
Monoclinic minerals
Minerals in space group 14